The 1929–30 CPHL season was the first and only season of the reborn Canadian Professional Hockey League, a minor professional ice hockey league in Ontario, Canada. Four teams participated in the league, and the Guelph Maple Leafs won the championship.

Regular season

The rules of the league stipulated that if the third-place team finished four points or less behind the second place team then a semi final would be played between them. Kitchener finished six points behind Galt so no semi final was played.

Final
Best of 5

Guelph Maple Leafs beat Galt Terriers 3 wins to

External links
Season on hockeydb.com

1929 in ice hockey
1930 in ice hockey
1929–30 in Canadian ice hockey by league